St. Benedict's Catholic Church is a Catholic church in Nebraska City, Nebraska, United States. It is on the National Register of Historic Places. The church parish was founded in 1856 and its building, completed in 1861, is the oldest brick church in the state of Nebraska.  The church's address is 411 5th Rue, Nebraska City, Nebraska.

It is a brick "vernacular Romanesque structure featuring buttresses and entry tower".

Its exterior walls were noticed to be spreading in 1948, and it was feared the roof would collapse. "The walls were dismantled, reinforced and then rebuilt using primarily original brick."

References

External links

St. Benedict's Catholic Church

Churches in the Roman Catholic Diocese of Lincoln
Churches in Nebraska City, Nebraska
Churches on the National Register of Historic Places in Nebraska
Historic American Buildings Survey in Nebraska
National Register of Historic Places in Otoe County, Nebraska
Churches completed in 1856
1856 establishments in Nebraska Territory
Roman Catholic churches completed in 1861
19th-century Roman Catholic church buildings in the United States